The Kings of the Time is a 2008 Estonian documentary and animated film directed by Mait Laas.

The film is dedicated to Estonian pioneers of animated film: Elbert Tuganov and Heino Pars.

Awards:
 2008: Eesti Kultuurkapitali Audiovisuaalse kunsti sihtkapitali preemia, best documentary film
 2008: Asolo Art Film festival (Italy), Premio Asolo for the Best Artist's Biography Film
 2012: Tampere Film Festival, Estonia Film 100 Years, participation

References

External links
 
 The Kings of the Time, entry in Estonian Film Database (EFIS)

2008 films
Estonian animated films
Estonian documentary films